Perla Judith Beltrán Acosta (born September 30, 1986) is a Mexican beauty queen from the state of Sinaloa, and the first runner-up in Miss World 2009.

Early life
An industrial engineering alumni, Beltrán was born in Culiacán, Sinaloa and raised in Guamúchil from the age of 10. Despite her admiration for beauty queens as a child, Beltrán never expected to take part in the pageant world. However, her mother convinced her to compete in a local contest for the first time in 2001, and she took home the title.

Nuestra Belleza Mexico
Prior to competing in Nuestra Belleza México, Beltrán participated in Miss Earth Mexico in 2007 and placed first runner-up as Miss Air. A year later, 21-year-old Beltrán represented her native Sinaloa in her country's national pageant, Nuestra Belleza México 2008, held in Monterrey, Nuevo León on September 20.

She was named Nuestra Belleza Mundo México among thirty-two other contestants, gaining the right to compete in the 59th Miss World pageant held in Johannesburg, South Africa.

Miss World 2009
As the official representative of her country to the 2009 Miss World pageant, Beltrán won the Miss World Top Model fast-track event, enabling her to automatically advance to the semifinals. She had previously placed among the top twelve in the Beach Beauty event. Beltrán subsequently obtainted the title of Miss World Americas and placed first runner-up to Miss World 2009, on December 12.

References

1986 births
Nuestra Belleza México winners
Miss World 2009 delegates
People from Culiacán
Models from Sinaloa
Living people
Mexican beauty pageant winners
People from Guamúchil